Carnets Geol. (previously Carnets de Géologie or Carnets de Géologie - Notebooks on Geology) is an electronic journal that publishes in the field of geosciences, and particularly paleontology, stratigraphy, and sedimentology. The open-access journal is one of the founding members of the OA portal Geoscience e-Journals. Since 2007, it is published by the eponymic Association Carnets de Géologie at the University of Western Brittany in Brest, France.

Description 
Carnets Geol. publishes peer-reviewed contributions (memoirs, articles, and letters) on an irregular basis, that is each new paper is released online as soon as possible after the editorial office received the latest reviewed and corrected version from the author(s). These contributions are written either in English, French, or both languages, but articles in Spanish, German, or Italian will also appear. All include titles, abstracts, and keywords in both English and French. In addition to the journal issues, the association also publishes OA e-books. All the journal contents, subject to a CC-BY-NC-SA 4.0 License, is freely available on the Internet from the main site hosted by the RedIRIS's servers and from institutional open archives sites. A CD version and later a DVD version were issued on an irregular basis.

History 
Carnets Geol. was founded in 2002 by Bruno Granier. The editorial office was first in Maintenon, France, before being moved to Brest in 2004. In 2004 and 2005, agreements were signed respectively with INIST and HAL (hyperarticles en ligne), in order to give a better visibility to the authors' scientific contributions. In 2007 (tome 4) and 2008 (tome 5), 500 sponsored copies of the CD version were issued. In 2009 (tome 6), 2010 (tome 7), 2011 (tome 8), 2012 (tome 9) and 2014 (tome 10), 1000 copies of the DVD version were issued and distributed.

External links 
 Carnets Geol. (English entry page)
 RoMEO SHERPA
 GRANIER B. (2010).- Les Carnets de Géologie.- Hermès, La Revue 2010/2 (no. 57), p. 109-110
 GRANIER B. (2019).- Intervention. In: Open publication et open évaluation, initiatives et enseignements des autres disciplines.- Le Libellio d’AEGIS, vol. 15, no. 4 – Hiver 2019, Open Science, p. 25-31

Paleontology journals
Geology journals
Open access journals
Creative Commons-licensed journals
Academic journals associated with universities and colleges